Edgar Coolidge may refer to:

 Edgar S. Coolidge (1855–?), member of the Vermont House of Representatives
 Edgar D. Coolidge (1881–1967), American dentist and endodontist.